The 1905 Springfield Training School football team was an American football team that represented the International Young Men's Christian Association Training School—now known as Springfield College–as an independent during the 1905 college football season. Led by second-year head coach Charles E. Street, the team compiled a record of 3–5.

Schedule

References

Springfield Training School
Springfield Pride football seasons
Springfield Training School football